Gennaro Acampora (born 29 March 1994) is an Italian professional footballer who plays as a midfielder for Benevento.

Club career
Acampora made his professional debut in the Serie B for Spezia on 11 October 2014 in a game against Pro Vercelli.

On 6 August 2021, he signed with Benevento.

Personal life
On 1 January 2021, he tested positive for COVID-19.

References

External links
 
 

Living people
1994 births
Footballers from Naples
Association football midfielders
Italian footballers
Spezia Calcio players
A.C. Perugia Calcio players
Virtus Entella players
Benevento Calcio players
Serie A players
Serie B players
Italy youth international footballers